Two ships of the Royal Navy have borne the name HMS Jalouse after the French word meaning jealous, suspicious, or wary:
 HMS Jalouse was the 18-gun  French Navy brig-corvette Jalouse launched in 1794 at Honfleur. The Royal Navy captured her in May 1797;  she was broken up in 1807.
 was a  launched in 1809 and sold in 1819.

Royal Navy ship names